Francisca is a 1981 Portuguese drama film based on the novel Fanny Owen by Agustina Bessa-Luís and directed by Manoel de Oliveira. The film was selected as the Portuguese entry for the Best Foreign Language Film at the 55th Academy Awards, but was not accepted as a nominee.

Cast
 Teresa Menezes as Francisca 'Fanny' Owen
 Diogo Dória as José Augusto
 Mário Barroso as Camilo

See also
 List of submissions to the 55th Academy Awards for Best Foreign Language Film
 List of Portuguese submissions for the Academy Award for Best Foreign Language Film

References

External links
 

1981 films
1981 drama films
1980s Portuguese-language films
Films based on works by Agustina Bessa-Luís
Films directed by Manoel de Oliveira
Films produced by Paulo Branco
Portuguese drama films